Erik Fankhouser (born May 30, 1980) is a professional American bodybuilder in the sport’s heavyweight class, more properly known these days as the IFBB OPEN class or Division.

Fankhouser began weight training while he was a student at West Liberty State College in West Liberty, West Virginia.  He originally focused on playing fullback for the school’s football team and participating in the shot put, discus, hammer and javelin events for the track team, and then turned his focus to bodybuilding. He won his first competitive bodybuilding tournament, the 2004 NPC Upper Ohio Valley, placing first in the junior division. He won the Mr. West Virginia title in the 2005 Mid Atlantic Grand Prix/West Virginia States.

In his first national competition, the 2006 North American Championship, he placed fourth in the heavyweight division. In 2007, he placed 16th in the USA Bodybuilding & Figure Championships, but in his next competition he placed first in his class in the North American Championships. He was also named overall winner for the competition and earned his IFBB pro card at that event. With his victory, Fankhouser made state sports history as the first West Virginia native to become a professional bodybuilder. Erik placed 10th in his first IFBB pro contest, the Europa Super Show, in August 2008, winning both Pose Down Magazine's "Best Wheels" and the 4Ever Fit Fans' Choice awards during the contest.

Fankhouser, who stands  and averages  in contest shape, goes by the nickname “The House.” He is sponsored in his training by the bodybuilding supplement companies Animalpak.com and Universal Nutrition.
He has also done guest posing at several bodybuilding tournaments, and writes weight training articles for Muscular Development Magazine.

Outside of competitive bodybuilding, he works as a Coal Miner at Bailey mine for Consol Energy.

Contest History

References

External links 
Official web site
Ironman Magazine profile
Video interview with Muscular Development Magazine

American bodybuilders
1980 births
Living people
Exercise physiologists
West Liberty University alumni